Sewer alligator stories date back to the late 1920s and early 1930s; in most instances they are part of contemporary legend. They are based upon reports of alligator sightings in rather unorthodox locations, in particular New York City.  

The New York Times reports the city rescues 100 alligators per year, some directly from homes where they are kept as illegal pets (which can be legally ordered online in other states and are legal to mail when small), and some from outside (where they can attract considerable attention) though mostly above-ground. 

Though escapees and former pets may survive for a short time in New York sewers, longer-term survival is not possible due to low temperatures and the bacteria in human feces. Sewer maintenance crews insist there is no underground population.

A similar story from 1851 involves feral pigs in the sewers of Hampstead, London.

Legend
Following the reports of sewer alligators in the 1930s, the story has built up over the decades and become more of a contemporary legend. Many have even questioned how accurate the original stories are, and some have even suggested they are fictions created by Teddy May, who was the Commissioner of Sewers at the time. Interviews with him were the basis of the first published accounts of sewer alligators.  However, the story of the "sewer gator" in New York City is well known and various versions have been told. In their honor, February 9 is Alligators in the Sewers Day in Manhattan.

Louisiana or Florida to New York City
As late as the middle of the 20th century, souvenir shops in Florida sold live baby alligators (in small fish tanks) as novelty souvenirs. Tourists from New York City would buy a baby alligator and try to raise it as a pet. When the alligator grew too large for comfort, the family would proceed to flush the reptile down the toilet.

What happens next varies. The most common story is that the alligators survive and reside within the sewer and reproduce, feeding on rats and garbage, growing to huge sizes and striking fear into sewer workers. In Robert Daley's book The World Beneath the City (1959) he comments that one night a sewer worker in New York City was shocked to find a large albino alligator swimming toward him. Weeks of hunting followed.

The Journal of American Folklore has this to say on the subject:

An additional reference to the sewer alligator exists in Thomas Pynchon's first novel, V. It fictionalizes the account, stating Macy's was selling them for a time for 50 cents.  Eventually the children became bored with the pets, setting them loose in the streets as well as flushing them into the sewers.  Rather than poison, shotguns were used as the remedy.  Benny Profane, one of the main characters in the book, continues to hunt them as a full-time job until the population is reduced.

A 1973 children's book, The Great Escape: Or, The Sewer Story by Peter Lippman anthropomorphizes these alligators and has them dress up in disguise as humans and charter an airplane to fly them home to the Florida swamps.

Versions including albinos and mutants

Some versions go further to suggest that, after the alligator was disposed of at such a young age, it would live the majority of its life in an environment not exposed to sunlight, and thus it would apparently in time lose its eyesight and the pigment in its hide and that the reptile would grow to be blind and completely albino (pure white in color with red or pink eyes). Another reason why an albino alligator would retreat to an underground sewer is its vulnerability to the sun in the wild; as there is no dark pigment in the creature's skin, it has no protection from the sun, which makes it very hard for it to survive in the wild.

Some people even spoke of mutant alligators living in the sewers which have been exposed to many different types of toxic chemical waste which altered them, making them deformed and sometimes even larger and with strange colouring. A gigantic mutant alligator based on these myths appears in the 1980 film of the same name.

Albino alligators feature in the Thomas Pynchon novel V.

Contemporary accounts
One 1927 account describes an experience of a Pittsburgh Bureau of Highways and Sewers employee who was assigned the task of clearing out a section of sewer pipe on Royal Street in the Northside Section of the city. The account reads, "[He] removed the manhole cover and began to clear an obstruction when he realized that a set of 'evil looking eyes' was staring at him." He then removed a three-foot alligator and took it home with him. There are other numerous recent media accounts of alligators occupying storm drains and sewer pipes, all from states in the southern US.

In Paris, France, a Nile crocodile was captured by firefighters in the sewers below the Pont Neuf bridge on March 7, 1984. The crocodile, named Elenore, lived at the Aquarium in Vannes then passed in May 2022.

A  baby alligator was caught in 2010 by the NYPD in the sewers in Queens. However, it is unlikely that a fully grown adult would survive for long in New York, due to the cold winter temperatures.

Alligators have been sighted in the drains and sewers of Florida as recently as 2017, due to many of these waste outlets' backing out onto the swamps. During storm surges and in the colder winter months, alligators sometimes shelter in convenient drains and hunt for rats to supplement their diet.

See also
 Alligator (film)
 Leatherhead (Teenage Mutant Ninja Turtles)

References
Notes

Sources
Tales From the Urban Crypt: Legendary whoppers about Gotham run the ghastly and ghostly gamut Urbanlegends.com. Retrieved April 26, 2010

External links
 Gatorhole.com
 Urbanlegends.About.com
 SewerGator.com
 IMDB page for 'Alligator'
 News. Alligator found in sewer in Florida. Oct. 2005
 Man Falls in with Alligator – St. Petersburg Times, June 16, 2000
 Gator Aid – Houston Press, May 25, 2006
 Alligator Stomp – Houston Press, January 27, 2005
 See Ya Later, Alligator – Bluffton Today, May 8, 2006
 No. 3: Reggie – DailyBreeze.com, December 28, 2005

Alligators and humans
Culture of New York City
Urban legends
Legendary reptiles
American legendary creatures
Subterranea (geography)
Alligator